The Moselle was a riverboat constructed at the Fulton shipyard, in Cincinnati, Ohio. between December 1, 1837 and March 31, 1838. The Moselle was considered one of the fastest river boats in operation at the time, having completed a record-setting two-day, sixteen-hour trip between Cincinnati and St. Louis. On April 25, 1838, the Moselle, piloted by Captain Isaac Perin, suffered a boiler explosion just east of Cincinnati, killing 160 of the estimated 280–300 passengers. The boat had just pulled away from a dock near the neighborhood of Fulton, when all four boilers simultaneously suffered a catastrophic failure resulting in the total destruction of the ship from the paddlewheels to the bow. The ship drifted approximately 100 yards before sinking to the bottom of the Ohio river. Negligence may have been a factor in the explosion: many eyewitness reports claimed that Captain Perin had been racing another riverboat, the Ben Franklin (1836) at the time of the explosion, and therefore the pressure in the boilers was excessively high.

References

External links
 Frederick Dwight s survivor of the disaster [.p.165

Shipwrecks of the Ohio River
Maritime boiler explosions
Maritime incidents in April 1838
Ships sunk by non-combat internal explosions